Václav Němeček (born 25 January 1967 in Hradec Králové) is a Czech former professional footballer. He played for Czechoslovakia and later the Czech Republic. As a combined total for both national teams, he played 60 matches and scored 6 goals.

He was a participant in the 1990 FIFA World Cup. He played for FC Hradec Králové, AC Sparta Prague, Toulouse FC, Servette Geneva and Dalian Wanda FC.

Honours
Sparta Prague
Czechoslovak First League: 1986-87, 1987-88, 1988-89, 1989-90, 1990-91
Gambrinus liga: 1997–98
Czechoslovak Cup: 1988, 1989, 1992

Dalian Wanda FC
Chinese Jia-A League: 1998

References

External links
 

Living people
1967 births
Sportspeople from Hradec Králové
Association football midfielders
Czech footballers
Czech Republic international footballers
Czechoslovak footballers
Czechoslovakia international footballers
Dual internationalists (football)
Czech expatriate footballers
Expatriate footballers in France
Expatriate footballers in Switzerland
FC Hradec Králové players
AC Sparta Prague players
Toulouse FC players
Ligue 1 players
Servette FC players
Swiss Super League players
Dalian Shide F.C. players
Czech First League players
1990 FIFA World Cup players
UEFA Euro 1996 players
Expatriate footballers in China
Czechoslovak expatriate footballers
Czechoslovak expatriate sportspeople in France
Czech expatriate sportspeople in France
Czech expatriate sportspeople in Switzerland
Czech expatriate sportspeople in China